Martyrs Lane is a 2021 British horror film written and directed by Ruth Platt, produced by Christine Alderson and Katie Hodgkin and starring Denise Gough, Steven Cree, Anastasia Hille, Hannah Rae and Kiera Thompson.

Plot
A 10 years-old girl named Leah (Kiera Thompson) lives in a large vicarage in England and every night she's visited by a mysterious guest who offers her knowledge.

Cast
 Denise Gough as Sarah
 Steven Cree as Thomas
 Anastasia Hille as Lillian
 Hannah Rae as Bex
 Kiera Thompson as Leah

Reception
The review aggregator website Rotten Tomatoes reported an approval rating of 91%, based on 32 reviews. The site's consensus states: "Well-acted by its young leads, Martyrs Lane tells a slow-burning ghost story that gathers real emotional weight". Metacritic, which uses a weighted average, assigned the film a score of 64 out of 100 based on 6 critics, indicating "generally favorable reviews".

Nick Allen writing for the website RogerEbert.com gave the film 31/2 out of 4 starts, stating: "'Martyrs Lane' is ruled by grief, often dulled and overdrawn by it, but its young surrogates give us the unique opportunity to see its themes presented without compromise". Phil Hoad from the newspaper The Guardian gave "Martyrs Lane" three out of five starts, saying: "Ruth Platt’s third film is at first almost too subtle for its own good. As Leah’s new friend directs her to small objects around the house and grounds, including minuscule letter-bearing dice, Platt’s storytelling is high-risk, almost obscure, leaving viewers much to infer". Wendy Ide from the British film magazine Screen International called it "a picture which would make a credible addition to midnight-movie strands, but which has an appeal which should extend beyond horror audiences. Tonally, with its emphasis on nurture and parent-child relations, there’s a kinship with films like Under the Shadow".

References

External links
 
 
 

2021 horror films
Ghost films
British horror films
2020s English-language films
2020s British films